The Régiment d'Agenois was a French infantry regiment created under the Ancien Régime in 1595.  It participated in the American War of Independence.

History
The regiment, commanded by Baron de Cadignan, suffered heavy casualties in d'Estaing's unsuccessful assault at Savannah (1779). A detachment of the Agenois Regiment participated in the siege and capture of Pensacola in Florida by Spanish forces on 26 May 1781.

In 1791 the Agenois lost its traditional title and was retitled the 16e Régiment d'Infanterie de Ligne. In 1794 all regular infantry regiments of the old Royal Army were amalgamated with newly raised volunteer battalions, thereby losing their former identity.

Uniform
During the reign of Louis XV the original Agenois Regiment wore a grey-white coat with red cuffs and waistcoat.

References

Military units and formations of France in the American Revolutionary War
Military units and formations established in 1776
Military units and formations disestablished in 1791
Line infantry regiments of the Ancien Régime